The X Factor Israel is the Israeli version of the British television music competition The X Factor. The third season started its run on Thursday, October 18, 2017 on Reshet network's Channel 2 and aired in prime time. After October 31, 2017, it was aired on Reshet 13.

Judges and hosts 
Israeli fashion model Bar Refaeli hosted the third season. Contrary to most other versions of the X Factor where the judges panels was a mixture of singers and music industry figures, the Israeli version was composed entirely of musicians. The judges panel for the first season was composed of the rock singer Rami Fortis, the pop singer-songwriter and composer Moshe Peretz, the pop and R&B singer Shiri Maimon, and the pop singer Ivri Lider. Fortis forfeited the judging role, and got replaced by the Israeli rapper Subliminal.

Contestants 
Key:
 – Winner
 – Runner-up
 – Third Place

Judges Houses

Results summary 

Color key

References

External links 
 

2017 Israeli television seasons
2018 Israeli television seasons
Israel